Koivu is a Finnish surname meaning "birch". Notable people with the surname include:

Mikko Koivu (born 1983), Finnish professional ice hockey player, brother of Saku 
Rudolf Koivu (1890 – 1946), Finnish artist
Saku Koivu (born 1974), retired Finnish professional ice hockey player, brother of Mikko

See also
Kõiv, an Estonian surname of the same etymology
Kõivu, an Estonian settlement

Finnish-language surnames